Monker Lake is a lake in Cook County, Minnesota, in the United States.

Monker Lake was named for Claus C. Monker, a Norwegian who settled there.

See also
List of lakes in Minnesota

References

Lakes of Minnesota
Lakes of Cook County, Minnesota